Saint Paulin or Saint-Paulin may refer to:
 Paulinus of Nola, (c. 354–431), Latin poet and letter-writer
 Saint-Paulin, Quebec, a municipality in Canada
 Saint-Paulin cheese, a type of cheese